Mulcair is an Irish language name.

Geography
 River Mulcair aka River Mulkear, in Ireland

People
 Barry Mulcair (born 1948), Australian-rules footballer
 Helen Mulcair, Irish camogie player
 Thomas Mulcair (born 1954), Canadian politician